James Eldon Swan (November 18, 1912 – 29 October 1995) was an American country musician.

Early life

Birth and childhood 
James Edgar Swan was born on November 18, 1912 in the Sand Hill area of Cullman County, Alabama. After his father left the family, Swan moved with his mother to Birmingham in 1922.

Marriage and musical firsts 
At age 15, he won a talent show at an Alabama radio station, but didn't make anything of it at first. He married at age 17 with Grace Armour, a beauty queen, and quickly had three children, Charles, Wanda, and Randy, and was unable to put together a band until the beginning of the 1940s, due to him having to provide for his family.

Later in his musical career he met Hank Locklin, and had Hank Williams play with him at various venues across Mississippi and Louisiana.

Move to Mississippi

Musical career 
He moved to Hattiesburg, Mississippi and worked in local radio as well as the honky tonk circuit. Disappointed with the drunken, violent lifestyle of honky tonk bars, he quit music to become a disc jockey in 1948, returning only in 1952 after an offer from Trumpet Records. Swan saw success with "I Had a Dream" and "The Last Letter", the latter a tribute to Hank Williams, who had died in 1953.

He signed with MGM Records and was groomed to be a successor act to Hank Williams, but he chafed at the more pop-oriented music the label wanted him to record in favor of a more hillbilly music sound. Still one of Swan's biggest nationwide hits was his hillbilly-country single "Good and Lonesome" written by his partner Bobby Enlow a Chet Atkins style guitarist and songwriter from Foxworth, Mississippi.

The song Good and Lonesome was written by Enlow for his sweetheart and future wife Billie Jean Kennedy who lived a few counties over in Magnolia, Mississippi. Bobby Enlow recorded into the 1960s but quickly fell from national view after suffering a broken neck in an automobile accident that left him paralyzed for six months. After that Enlow did regain his musical talent but not his desire to play music seven nights a week. The end of the wildly popular Swann/Enlow partnership was coming to an end.

In 1966, Swan was more concerned with his radio station in Hattiesburg, WBKH, than about his singing.

Swan's first issue on CD was with Bear Family Records in 1993.

Politics 
Swan also fell from the national stage and in Swan's later life, he retired from music completely and went into politics, running for sheriff of Hattiesburg and then running for the Democratic primary for governor of Mississippi in 1967 and 1971, which he both lost.

Democratic primary for Governor of Mississippi

1967 election 
In 1967, he ran in the Democratic primary for the governorship of Mississippi on a White supremacy platform, wearing a white suit to stress his political program. His campaign bodyguard Pat Massengale was a member of the Knights of the Green Forrest, a Ku Klux Klan organization.

He supported school segregation and the creation of “FREE, private, SEGREGATED SCHOOLS for every white child in the State of Mississippi" in the first twelve months of his term, or else he would resign and publicly apologize, and called to save Mississippi "from the moral degeneracy of total mass integration that Washington has decreed for our children this fall", when schools were to be integrated by the HEW.

He supported White supremacy, telling that granting equality to the African Americans was to make savagery the equal of civilization. About the urban riots of this year, he described them as a part of a "Communist-inspired revolution", promising to use extreme force if such riots occurred in Mississippi.

He managed to attract segregationists who disagreed with how Ross Barnett managed the Ole Miss riot of 1962, finding him too moderate.

Finally, he called to "put the Bible, prayer and patriotism back in the schools."

He finished third, with 18.18% of the vote.

1971 election 
Swan ran for the Democratic nomination for governor on a segregationist platform, the lone one alongside Judge Marshall Perry of Grenada.

Although he somewhat tried to soften his rhetoric, he still praised Theodore Bilbo, brandishing in public his book Take Your Choice: Separation Or Mongrelization.

Personal life

Discography

Notes and references

Works cited

See also

 [ Jimmy Swan] at Allmusic

1912 births
1995 deaths
American country singer-songwriters
MGM Records artists
Decca Records artists
20th-century American singers
Musicians from Birmingham, Alabama
People from Hattiesburg, Mississippi
Country musicians from Alabama
Country musicians from Mississippi
Mississippi Democrats
American white supremacists
Trumpet Records artists
Singer-songwriters from Alabama
Singer-songwriters from Mississippi